781 Kartvelia is a minor planet orbiting the Sun that was discovered by Russian astronomer Grigory Neujmin on January 25, 1914. Kartvelia comes from the historic name for the inhabitants of the nation of Georgia. The orbital plane is inclined at an angle of 19.1° to the plane of the ecliptic.

This asteroid is rotating with a period of 19.0 hours and spans an estimated girth of 66 km. It is tentatively classified as type CPU in the Tholen taxonomic system, with the C indicating a carbonaceous object. This is the namesake of a family of 49–232 asteroids that share similar spectral properties and orbital elements; hence they may have arisen from the same collisional event. All members have a relatively high orbital inclination.

References

External links 
 Discovery Circumstances: Numbered Minor Planets
 
 

000781
Discoveries by Grigory Neujmin
Named minor planets
000781
000781
19140125